"First Love" is a song by American DJ duo Lost Kings featuring vocals from American singer Sabrina Carpenter, released as a single on October 13, 2017, by Disruptor and RCA records. The track was written by Albin Nedler, Brittany Amaradio, Kristoffer Fogelmark, Noris Shanholz, Rami Yacoub and Robert Abisi with Lost Kings handling the production.

Composition 
Musically, "First Love" is a dance and synth-pop song. Lost Kings described it that it is meant to make you "feel all of the feels".

Music video 
The Tyler Bailey directed music accompanied the song's release and was filmed in New York City.

Live performances 
Carpenter performed the song in various shows on Jingle Ball 2017 along with Thumbs, Why and Have Yourself a Merry Little Christmas. She also performed the song on Honda Stage at The Hammerstein Ballroom.

Track listing

Personnel 
Credits adapted from Tidal.

 Lost Kings - production
 Sabrina Carpenter - vocals, featured artist
 Albin Nedler - lyricist, composition
 Brittany Amaradio - lyricist, composition
 Kristoffer Fogelmark - lyricist, composition
 Noris Shanholz - lyricist, composition, recording
 Rami Yacoub - lyricist, composition
 Robert Abisi - lyricist, composition
 Dave Kutch - mastering
 Mitch McCarthy - mixing

Charts

Weekly charts

Year-end charts

Release history

References 

2017 songs
2017 singles
Sabrina Carpenter songs
Songs written by Rami Yacoub
Songs written by Kristoffer Fogelmark
Songs written by Albin Nedler